Organic engineering systems (OES) are organic, hydroponic, aeroponic or aquaponic farming technologies that are designed as a building engineering system.  The main purpose of these technologies is to grow food in buildings.  OES are agricultural technologies and are considered a sub-section of ecological engineering, primarily because they mimic natural ecosystems to produce food and are defined as urban horticulture.

References

Building engineering
Agricultural technology